Down IV – Part II is the second EP by American sludge metal band Down. It was released in May 2014 via Down Records. It is the only release by the band featuring guitarist Bobby Landgraf, who replaced founding member Kirk Windstein in 2013, before Windstein returned to the band in late 2019. The album was recorded in frontman Phil Anselmo's home studio Nodferatu's Lair in Louisiana.

Track listing

Personnel
 Phil Anselmo − vocals
 Pepper Keenan − guitar
 Bobby Landgraf − guitar
 Pat Bruders − bass
 Jimmy Bower − drums

Production
Produced by Michael Thompson and Down
Engineered by Michael Thompson and Stephen "The Big Fella" Berrigan
Mixed by Michael Thompson and Phil Anselmo, assisted by Stephen Berrigan
Mastered by Eric Conn

References

2014 EPs
Down (band) albums